Nadeesha Dilhani Lekamge (born 14 October 1987) is a Sri Lankan javelin thrower. She won a silver medal at the 2017 Asian Championships.

Life
Lekamge was born in 1987 in the town of Eheliyagoda on Sri Lanka. It was there that she was educated at the Mahinda School.

She became as a private in the Sri Lankan army. She won a silver medal at the 2017 Asian Championships with a throw of 58.11m.

She was placed fifth at the 2018 Commonwealth Games.

References

Sri Lankan female javelin throwers
1987 births
Living people
People from Sabaragamuwa Province
Athletes (track and field) at the 2018 Commonwealth Games
Commonwealth Games competitors for Sri Lanka